Pagpag: Siyam na Buhay (referred to as Pagpag: 9 Lives) is a 2013 Filipino supernatural horror film directed by Frasco S. Mortiz. The film was released on December 25, 2013, at the Metro Manila Film Festival and stars Kathryn Bernardo and Daniel Padilla with Paulo Avelino and Shaina Magdayao. The film follows a group of teenagers that are terrorized by an evil spirit after they not follow the Filipino paranormal superstitions called "pagpag".

The film revolves around the traditional Filipino belief that one should never go home directly after visiting a wake since it risks bringing evil spirits or the deceased to one's home. The movie grossed ₱23.7M on its first day of showing.

Plot 

Zarina (Empress Schuck) visits the funeral of her boyfriend Joseph Maurice (Enchong Dee) who hung himself. She is driven away by the boy's mother, insisting her son died because of her. When she arrives home, her sister asks her if she did the "pagpag" but she replies that she doesn't believe in it. Afterwards, she is suddenly haunted by the ghost of her dead boyfriend.

Cedric (Daniel Padilla), his friends; Hannah (Michelle Vito), Ashley (Miles Ocampo), Justin (CJ Navato) and Rico (Dominic Roque) enter a horror house. Hannah is assaulted by one of the men in the haunted house and Cedric fights for her. At home, Cedric's father scolds and grounds him and takes Cedric's fake keys for the car. While his Dad gave orders to their maid, Cedric escapes and drives the highways until he almost runs over a girl, Leni (Kathryn Bernardo). They fight and Leni unknowingly loses her charm bracelet in Cedric's car.

Cedric and his friends party on a hill. Cedric and Hannah have a heated argument which ends in Cedric revealing that he doesn't actually have feelings for Hannah and is not ready for a committed relationship, which prompts her to throw a rock at Cedric, wounding his shoulder. Cedric loses control and drives up until morning where they come upon the funeral of Roman (Paulo Avelino) with his wife, Lucy (Shaina Magdayao), in despair. They soon discover that the funeral was arranged by Leni, Dencio (Janus del Prado) and Marcelo (Marvin Yap). After the funeral, Marcelo is seen sweeping the room when Eva (Matet de Leon) suddenly scolds him as it was a bad superstition. All of the unwanted guests violate a superstition including: Hannah, who dropped tears on the coffin when she saw Cedric holding Leni's hand; Rico, who wiped the coffin with a handkerchief; Justin, who stole bread from the funeral; Ashley for looking at her reflection in the mirror; Cedric, by attending the funeral with a wound; Dencio, who stole the money below the coffin and Leni and everyone else who did not do the "Pagpag," an act of dusting off oneself after a funeral to avoid evil spirits following you home.

At home, Leni's adopted brother Mac-Mac (Clarence Delgado) sees apparitions and draws nine figures with a number 8. Marcelo who was sweeping outside is killed by a malevolent entity. Dencio blames Leni for not doing the Pagpag and tells her that the spirit is coming back for the rest of them. He proceeds to tell her the story of how Roman, the husband of Lucy, died. Roman and Lucy once had a child who unfortunately died. Roman made a pact with the demons to bring back his son's life, but on the consequence that he kill nine people in order to do so, and he willingly obliged. After committing his sins, he found his son well and alive inside his coffin. One night, the people from the barrio tried to burn Roman's house down because they knew he was working for the devil. This act led to the loss of Roman and his son, Emmanuel lives.

Meanwhile, Hannah is planning to commit suicide when she suddenly sees a shadow which she thought it was Cedric's, which she tries to follow. After a while, her phone suddenly rings and it turns out to be Cedric telling her that he is on his way there. Hannah panics and a demonic form gouges her eyes out and throws her into the pool, killing her. Cedric witnesses the event and is blamed for what happened. One by one, Cedric's friends are killed by the unknown entity they brought back with them from the funeral. Rico is killed when the soul from his handkerchief throws him against a wall in a gym's shower room, which he first thought was Justin and says that he is really gay. Cedric consults Justin and Ashley and insists them to burn the clothes they wore so they did.

Cedric decides to go back to the house of Lucy so he can talk to Eva (Lucy's older sister). While on his way, he sees Leni in the market and decided to follow her. While in the market, Leni suddenly sees the ghost of Roman which caused her to run and panic. Cedric saw Leni panicking causing him to worry about her and chase after her. Leni blacks out while being chased and Cedric rescues her before Roman's ghost catches her. Cedric brings Leni to his car and drives. Leni woke up and was alarmed she ordered Cedric to stop the car. After the car stopped she and Cedric talked, they both find out they have the same goal and decided to team up.

When they found the coffin, the body is not there anymore. They searched the house and saw three human figures in the wall drew in blood. Leni goes to find Mac-Mac in the church and Dencio, together with Eva also arrives to warn them and tells the group that Mac-Mac is really Emmanuel. She tells them that during the fire, she went there to save the baby in order for him to stay away from the demonic lives of his parents.

When Eva tells Cedric and Leni that the body is in their old house, they went to find it. In the church, Mac-Mac was then trapped inside. Eva is killed when she is sucked inside a tomb. Meanwhile, Ashley and Justin had done what Cedric asked them to do, they went inside Ashley's house, Justin told Ashley he will leave for a while to make a sandwich in the kitchen which caused Ashley to panic and to be scared. To overcome her fear she took pictures of herself but while she was taking pictures she saw one of the images has the face of the ghost. She is soon thrown to a mirror then falls down. Ashley is impaled by a falling chandelier and Justin, who was running away in the streets calling Cedric about it was crushed by two trucks, getting sandwiched in between.

In the church, Dencio is trapped inside his car when he plans to save Mac-Mac in the church. The spirit taunts him and he tries to give back the money he stole. He rolls down the windows and tries to get out but is ultimately killed after his neck being impaled by a shattered glass of a car window. When Mac-Mac is able to get out from the church, he sees the spirits of the recently killed victims warning them that Cedric and Leni are both in danger. He then follows Roman's spirit on the way to the house.

Meanwhile, when Cedric and Leni find the old house, they realize that it was Lucy who sent her husband's spirit to murder the victims until he obtains nine lives for him to be alive. Mac-Mac rushes in to save them but he is caught by Lucy and threatens to kill him. Before she does, they tell Lucy the truth about Emmanuel. The entity tries to kill Leni and Cedric, but Lucy intervenes and was impaled by a girder. After Roman finally reanimates from the dead, he rushes to Lucy, who reveals to him that she was pregnant which killed their second child and explain to him that their son is still alive before she dies from her wound. Enraged of her death, Roman attempts to kill Leni before being stabbed by Cedric.

In the aftermath, Cedric arrives in the hospital to visit Leni and Mac-Mac. Within seconds of having fun, they see the apparitions of Lucy and Roman smiling at them eerily.

Cast 

 Kathryn Bernardo as Leni Dela Torre
 Daniel Padilla as Cedric Castillo
 Paulo Avelino as Roman
 Shaina Magdayao as Lucy
 Clarence Delgado as Mac-Mac / Emmanuel
 Matet de Leon as Eva
 Janus del Prado as Dencio
 CJ Navato as Justin
 Miles Ocampo as Ashley
 Dominic Roque as Rico
 Michelle Vito as Hannah
 Marvin Yap as Marcelo
 Manuel Chua as SPO2 Manlajas
 Eric Nicolas as SPO4 Garcia
 Enchong Dee as Joseph Maurice
 Empress Schuck as Zarina
 Shamaine Buencamino as Evelyn
 Dominic Ochoa as Cedric's Father
 Yves Flores as Bully
 Joe Vargas as Bully
 DM Sevilla as Bully
 Patrick Sugui as Bully
 Mosang as Ningning
 JD Baltazar as Cedric's Friend

Reception

Critical reception
Zig Marasigan of Rappler named the film as "‘Pagpag:' Stylish superstition" and added, "Although Pagpag does lack in scares, it does deliver on a handful of satisfying thrills that may be cheap but are thoroughly entertaining."

Box office gross
Pagpag: Siyam na Buhay grossed ₱23.7M on its first day of showing. The movie total Box-Office Gross ₱182,750,969 including ₱87,752,439 in Metro Manila, and ₱94,998,530 provincially. Made the movie at No.6 Star Cinema top-grossing MMFF entries from 2009-2013

Accolades

See also 
List of ghost films
List of highest-grossing Filipino films in 2013

References

External links 
 (in Tagalog)

Star Cinema films
Regal Entertainment films
Philippine supernatural horror films
2013 horror films
2013 films
Philippine ghost films
Mosang films
Films directed by Frasco Santos Mortiz